The North-West Tasmania Thunder are an Australian basketball team based in Ulverstone, Tasmania. The Thunder compete in the Men's NBL1 South and play their home games at Ulverstone Sports & Leisure Centre. For sponsorship reasons, they are known as the St.LukesHealth North-West Thunder.

Team history
The team was established in 1986 as Devonport and debuted in the South East Australian Basketball League (SEABL). The team changed their name to North-West Tasmania in 1994 and made the SEABL playoffs for the first time under coach Phil Thomas.

In 1996, the North West Boag's Originals won the CBA South Conference championship after defeating the Ballarat Miners in a thrilling overtime victory in the South Conference final. The Originals then went on to win the CBA quarter-final against Dandenong, the semi-final against Brisbane and then the championship final against Knox. All four finals were held at the Originals' home court at the Devonport Sports Stadium. The team lost three games early in the season and then went on an unprecedented winning streak, to end the season with a 19–3 record. The make-up of the Originals' 1996 squad included imports Dave Biwer and Jason Pepper as well as naturalised former American Keith Bragg and Australians Marcus Bellchambers, Ben Harvey and Ben Armstrong.

In 2003, the team was renamed the Thunder after being known as the Brewers for a number of years. The following year, the Thunder collected their second SEABL South Conference championship before winning through to the ABA National Final, where they were defeated 104–100 by the Cairns Marlins.

In 2019, following the demise of the SEABL, the Thunder joined the NBL1 South.

References

External links
Official team website

South East Australian Basketball League teams
Basketball teams in Tasmania
Basketball teams established in 1986
1986 establishments in Australia
North West Tasmania